The Rock and Pillar Range of high hills is located in the Maniototo, an area of inland Otago, New Zealand. They are surrounded by the Taieri River, which has its source in the range, flowing out across the scroll plain at Paerau, before almost doubling back on itself at Waipiata and flowing back along the other side through the Strath-Taieri. The town of Middlemarch lies close to the Taieri to the east of the range, and Patearoa lies to the northwest.

The Rock and Pillars are a horst range, caused by movement on two parallel faults uplifting the area in between. Thus, the range is characterised by a very flat top, with steep escarpments on either side. The Great Moss Swamp lies on the upper surface of the range. There is a persistent and highly unusual cloud formation associated with the range.  This strange cloud formation, found only in one or two places in the world, is more or less stationary and is called the Taieri Pet by the local inhabitants. It is formed by high north-westerly winds being forced upward over the Rock & Pillar range. Big Hut, situated near the summit of the range, is available for public use.

Summit Peak  
The range takes its name from the rock formations that cover parts of it. Several lower points include Stonehenge  and McPhee's Rock .

Fauna and Flora 
The nationally endangered Burgan Skink is endemic to the Rock and Pillar range. This range is also an area of narrow-range endemism for New Zealand endemic moths. The moth species Ichneutica schistella can only be found in this area.

References 

Mountain ranges of Otago
Horsts (geology)